Cataract is a census-designated place (CDP) in the Town of Little Falls in Monroe County, Wisconsin, United States. As of the 2010 census, its population was 186.

Geography

Attractions
The Paul and Matilda Wegner Grotto, located southwest of the village, is an outdoor collection of concrete folk-art sculptures encrusted with shards of glass, ceramics, seashells, and other materials. These have a variety of themes, including religious and patriotic subjects and more personal mementos of the lives of Paul and Matilda Wegner. The grotto was built between 1929 and 1942 by the Wegners on their farm, and is now owned by Monroe County and maintained by an endowment established for that purpose.

Southeast of Cataract is The Little Falls Railroad & Doll Museum, with a garden railway, model railroad layout, and doll collection.

The Walczak-Wontor Quarry Pit Workshop is located in the vicinity of Cataract; it is listed on the National Register of Historic Places.

Notable people
 John McKendree Springer, Methodist clergyman, was born in Cataract.
 Bryan Jandt Born 1962 – Living. Born in Sparta Wisconsin yet spent informative years in Cataract. Legendary Bowhunter, Baseball Player of the region.
 Mark Abbott: Born 1962 – Living. Born in a log cabin in the woods near Cataract. Renowned Trout fisherman, Bowhunter, and Baseball Player.

Images

See also
 List of census-designated places in Wisconsin

References

External links

Census-designated places in Monroe County, Wisconsin
Census-designated places in Wisconsin